Lindsay Redvers Mark Seymour Croisdale-Appleby  (born 12 May 1973) is a British diplomat and Head of the UK Mission to the European Union. Appointed in January 2021, he formally presented his credentials to the President of the European Commission on 29 July 2021. He was Ambassador to Colombia from 2012 to 2015.

Early life
He studied Modern History at St Hugh's College, Oxford. From Lancaster University he gained an MA in international relations and international law.

Career
Croisdale-Appleby joined the Foreign and Commonwealth Office (FCO) in 1996 and served as Principal Private Secretary to the Foreign Secretary 2010–2012. He then served as Ambassador to Colombia from November 2012 to 2015 before taking up an appointment as Europe Director in the Foreign Office. He was promoted to Director-General, EU Exit at the Foreign Office in 2017. 

He was appointed Companion of the Order of St Michael and St George (CMG) in the 2020 New Year Honours for services to British foreign policy. On 21 January 2021, he was appointed to succeed Sir Tim Barrow as Head of the UK Mission to the European Union.

Personal life
He married Barbara Jaimes-Quero in September 2003 and they have a son and a daughter. He has an older brother.

References

External links
 Lindsay Croisdale-Appleby, gov.uk

 

 

1973 births
Living people
Alumni of St Hugh's College, Oxford
Alumni of Lancaster University
Principal Private Secretaries to the Secretary of State for Foreign and Commonwealth Affairs
Ambassadors of the United Kingdom to Colombia
Place of birth missing (living people)
Companions of the Order of St Michael and St George